In Basque mythology, Odei, also known as Hodei is a spirit of thunder and the personification of storm clouds.

References

Basque legendary creatures
Basque mythology
Nature spirits